Pinacoclymenia was a genus of ammonites that existed during the Devonian.

References

Devonian ammonites
Late Devonian first appearances
Late Devonian animals
Famennian extinctions
Cyrtoclymeniina
Ammonite genera